The Battle of Moel-y-don was a battle fought in 1282 war during the conquest of Wales by Edward I. Also known as the Battle of the Bridge of Boats, it is now considered unlikely the battle site was near Moel-y-don, but farther north.

Background
After stripping much Welsh land from Llywelyn ap Gruffudd in 1277, Edward I of England imposed harsh terms on the lands he had conquered. He had been aided in 1277 by many Welshmen, including Llywelyn's own brother Dafydd ap Gruffydd, but the terms of the peace, coupled with domination by English laws and by Edward's officials drove many of them into rebellion. The war began when Dafydd turned against the English and slaughtered the garrison of Hawarden Castle.

Edward raised several armies through levy and indenture, and sent them into Wales on multiple fronts to surround and destroy Llywelyn's armies. One important expedition, consisting of 2000 infantrymen and 200 cavalrymen under the former constable of Gascony, Luke de Tany, was sent to capture the island of Anglesey. This would deprive the Welsh of much of their grain, and outflank the Welsh who were defending the Conwy.

The battle
After successfully capturing Anglesey, Luke de Tany's men constructed a bridge of boats across the Menai Strait which separates Anglesey from the mainland. Edward's plan was to cross the River Conwy while Tany crossed the Menai and attacked from the north. However, Tany ignored the plan, believing he could defeat the Welsh without Edward's aid. He had contacted some of the clergy in Bangor, who had promised to aid him by giving a signal when the time was right to attack.

The bridge was finished in September that year and, on 6 November, Tany and his men crossed the bridge, having been given the signal to attack. Llywelyn ap Gruffydd had been alerted to the crossing somehow, and emerged with a large army to meet the English as they crossed. A rising tide cut off de Tany's men from the bridge. When they tried to flee, many of them drowned when their heavy armour dragged them under the sea. Walter of Guisborough wrote an account of the battle:
When they had reached the foot of the mountain and, after a time, came to a place at some distance from the bridge, the tide came in with a great flow, so that they were unable to get back to the bridge for the debt of water. The Welsh came from the high mountains and attacked them, and in fear and trepidation, for the great number of the enemy, our men preferred to face the sea than the enemy. They went into the sea but, heavily laden with arms, they were instantly drowned.
Luke de Tany, the nobles Roger de Clifford, Phillip and William Burnell (brothers of the chancellor Robert Burnell), sixteen English knights (and their esquires) and over 400 of Tany's men perished. The Welsh suffered few casualties. The remaining English army made it back to Anglesey; their losses, however, were too great for them to launch a further attack.

Aftermath
This victory, and the Battle of Llandeilo Fawr in which another English army was destroyed in South Wales, boosted Welsh morale and set back Edward's plans for conquering Wales.

References

Also http://battlefields.rcahmw.gov.uk/collections/getrecord/404319

Battles involving Wales
Battles involving England
1282 in England
13th century in Wales
Conflicts in 1282
1282 in Wales
England–Wales relations